Leonidas Robinson may refer to:

Leonidas D. Robinson, former US Congressman
Leonidas I. Robinson, 3LT in the USRCS, died in action